The men's 1500 metres competition at the 2012 Summer Olympics in London, United Kingdom, was held at the Olympic Stadium on 3–7 August. Forty-three athletes from 29 nations competed. The event was won by Taoufik Makhloufi of Algeria, the nation's first title and medal in the event since 1996. Leonel Manzano's silver was the first medal for the United States in the men's 1500 metres since 1968. Morocco earned its fourth medal in six Games with Abdalaati Iguider's bronze. Kenya's four-Games podium streak ended.

Summary

The first round races were all very tightly packed, strategic affairs. The first race was the fastest, taking all but one of the time qualifiers into the semi-final. Andrew Wheating's 3:40.92 in the second heat was the slowest time qualifier, though it was exactly equal to Nick Willis' winning time in the last race. That race was broken up when Nixon Chepseba tripped sending several athletes scrambling to avoid the falling body. Chepseba ultimately finished 9th but was awarded a place in the semi-final on appeal, though no offending athlete was disqualified.

The first semi final was strategic from the start, when the sprinting started, Taoufik Makhloufi easily took the lead and held the position. Since it was strategic, no time qualifiers came from this semi. In the other semi, Chepseba took it out at a faster pace, to avoid getting caught in traffic. At the 800 mark, Nathan Brannen fell flat and was not able to get back into contention. When the sprinting started, Abdalaati Iguider looked to be the fastest. The slowest time qualifier was almost 7 seconds faster than Makhloufi winning the first.

Earlier on the day before the final, Makhloufi was also in an 800 metres qualifying round race, but he ran slowly and dropped out.  Because of the "honest effort" rule, he was disqualified from further competition in the Olympics.  It took an appeal by Algerian team officials to get him re-instated by claiming he had a known knee injury.

In the final, Makhloufi made a miraculous recovery from the injury in order to run. Kenyan Chepseba, and Kenyan born Bahraini Belal Mansoor Ali ran shoulder to shoulder until 600 to go when Chepseba then decided to take the lead solo. Behind him runners were three abreast, with Makhloufi and Silas Kiplagat trading elbows to be in position for the final lap. Another elbow just before 300 to go, and Makhloufi broke away with Kiplagat and Mekonnen Gebremedhin in hot pursuit. With Makhloufi gone, 8 meters ahead, Gebremedhin took over second at the head of the stretch, Iguider sprinting a step behind. Five meters further back, Leonel Manzano was starting to sprint around teammate Matthew Centrowitz, Jr. As Iguider was edging ahead of Gebremedhin, Manzano was rocketing along the outside passing into second 30 meters from the finish. Iguider just barely managed to finish a fraction ahead of the fast closing Centrowitz for the bronze medal.

Background

This was the 27th appearance of the event, which is one of 12 athletics events to have been held at every Summer Olympics. Five finalists from 2008 returned: gold medalist Asbel Kiprop of Kenya, silver medalist Nicholas Willis of New Zealand, fifth-place finisher Abdalaati Iguider of Morocco, seventh-place finisher Belal Mansoor Ali of Bahrain, and eighth-place finisher Andrew Baddeley of Great Britain. Kiprop was the reigning world champion as well as defending gold medalist; the rest of the Kenyan team (Silas Kiplagat and Nixon Chepseba) was strong as well, with an outside chance of a medal sweep considered.

Latvia made its first appearance in the event. The United States made its 26th appearance, most of all nations (having missed only the boycotted 1980 Games).

Qualification

A National Olympic Committee (NOC) could enter up to 3 qualified athletes in the men's 1500 metres event if all athletes met the A standard, or 1 athlete if they met the B standard. The maximum number of athletes per nation had been set at 3 since the 1930 Olympic Congress. The qualifying time standards could be obtained in various meets during the qualifying period that had the approval of the IAAF. Indoor and outdoor meets were eligible. The A standard for the 2012 men's 1500 metres was 3:35.50; the B standard was 3:38.00. The qualifying period for was from 1 May 2011 to 8 July 2012. NOCs could also have an athlete enter the 1500 metres through a universality place. NOCs could enter one male athlete in an athletics event, regardless of time, if they had no male athletes meeting the qualifying A or B standards in any men's athletic event.

Competition format

The men's 1500m competition consisted of heats (Round 1), semifinals and a final. In Round 1 the first six in each heat plus the next six fastest overall advanced to the semifinals. In the semifinals the first five in each heat along with the next two fastest overall qualified for the final.

Records

Prior to this competition, the existing world and Olympic records and world leading times were as follows:

The following national records were set during this competition

Schedule

All times are British Summer Time (UTC+1)

Results

Round 1
Qual. rule: first 6 of each heat (Q) plus the 6 fastest times (q) qualified.

Heat 1

Heat 2

Heat 3

Semifinals

Qual. rule: first 5 of each semifinal (Q) plus the 2 fastest times (q) qualified.

Semifinal 1

Semifinal 2

Final

References

Athletics at the 2012 Summer Olympics
1500 metres at the Olympics
Men's events at the 2012 Summer Olympics